Yuhuan is a city in Zhejiang, China.

Yuhuan may also refer to:

Aisin Gioro Yuhuan (1929 – 2003), Chinese artist
Yang Guifei, or Yang Yuhuan

See also
Yu Huan